Marksuhl is a village and a former municipality in the Wartburgkreis district of Thuringia, Germany. Since July 2018, it is part of the municipality Gerstungen.

Geography
Marksuhl is located in the center of the Wartburgkreis district, approximately 15 kilometers south of Eisenach

The landscape around Marksuhl is shaped in the north by the Thuringian Forest with the Rennsteig, and in the south by the Frauenseer Forest. The highest point (about 565 meters above sea level) in the municipality is a section of the slope on Todtemann, a hill on the Rennsteig near Ruhla. Several mountains also exist within the municipality.

The Suhl and its tributaries form the natural water system in the southern part of the municipality. The northern part lies in the Elte valley with its numerous, mostly nameless, source streams.

References

Former municipalities in Thuringia
Wartburgkreis